This is a partial chronological list of cases decided by the United States Supreme Court decided during the Taney Court, the tenure of Chief Justice Roger B. Taney from March 28, 1836 through October 12, 1864.

References 

Taney
List